Princess Elena can refer to:
Elena Flores, character
Infanta Elena, Duchess of Lugo, person